Amelia County Public Schools is a school district that serves Amelia County, Virginia in primary and secondary education. The district is headquartered in Amelia Courthouse. The district is led by superintendent is Dr. Lori Harper.

The school district became desegregated in the 1960s after the Brown v. Board of Education supreme court case.

Schools

Elementary Schools (Pre-K-5) 

 Amelia County Elementary School – Amelia Court House

Middle Schools (6-8) 

 Amelia County Middle School – Amelia Courthouse

High Schools (9-12) 

 Amelia County High School (Raiders) – Amelia Courthouse

Alternative Schools 

 Amelia-Nottoway Technical Center – Jetersville

Former Schools 

 Russell Grove High School – Amelia Courthouse 

The all-black Russell Grove High School merged with Amelia County High School in the 1960s.

Finances 
As of the 2016–2017 school year, the appraised valuation of property in the district was 19,834,000 as of 2016–2017.

Demographics

Transportation 
ACPS Operates 36 different bus routes with a few routes that span into different counties.

Other Activities 
Amelia County High School competes in Class 2A of the James River District in the Virginia High School League.

See also 

 List of school divisions in Virginia
List of high schools in Virginia

References

External links 

http://www.amelia.k12.va.us/schools
http://www.amelia.k12.va.us/UserFiles/Servers/Server_60458/File/Webmaster/Transportation/BUS_ROUTE%20-%202019-2020.pdf

School divisions in Virginia
Education in Amelia County, Virginia